The discography of Indonesian-born French singer-songwriter Anggun consists of eleven studio albums, two soundtrack albums, three greatest hits albums, seven single compilations, 38 singles and 20 music videos. Anggun began performing at the age of seven and recorded a children's album two years later. Her debut studio album, Dunia Aku Punya, was released in 1986 under Billboard Indonesia, but did not achieve commercial success. Her popularity was later established after the success of the single "Mimpi", which was listed as one of the 150 Greatest Indonesian Songs of All Time. With the release of subsequent singles and three more studio albums— Anak Putih Abu Abu, Nocturno and Anggun C. Sasmi... Lah!!!—Anggun became one of the most successful Indonesian rock singers in the early 1990s. In 1993, she became the youngest Indonesian singer to found her own record company, Bali Cipta Records. By the age of 19, she had sold over four million albums in Indonesia.

In 1994, Anggun released a greatest hits album, Yang Hilang, and move to Europe to pursue an international career. In 1996, she signed to Columbia Records and released her first French-language album, Au nom de la lune. "La neige au Sahara" was released as the album first single and quickly became a hit in France, peaking at number 1 on the French Airplay Chart and number 16 on the French Singles Chart. The English version of the album, Snow on the Sahara, was released by Sony Music Entertainment in 33 countries across Asia, Europe and America. It sold over 2 million copies worldwide and received Diamond Export award. The single, "Snow on the Sahara", topped the charts in Italy, Spain and several countries in Asia, and the top five on the UK Club Chart. In the United States, the album peaked at number 23 on the Billboard Heatseekers Albums Chart and shipped 200,000 units. The single also charted at number 16 on the Billboard Hot Dance Music/Club Play and number 22 on the Billboard Adult Top 40.

Anggun's second international album, Chrysalis for English version and Desirs contraires for French version, was released in 2000 and was certified Platinum Export award. Its lead single, "Still reminds Me" which reached the top five on the European Border Breakers Chart. Anggun released a soundtrack album to Danish film Open Hearts in 2002. The single, "Open Your Heart", charted at number 51 on the Norwegian Singles Chart and earned Anggun a nomination for Best Song at the 2003 Robert Awards, the Danish equivalent of Academy Awards. Her contract with Columbia and Sony Music ended in 2003 due to the company's structural change. She signed a new record deal with Heben Music, an independent label in France. In 2005, Anggun released her third international studio album, Luminescence, which shares the same title in both English and French. The album sold over 1 million copies worldwide and produced the single "Saviour", which was featured on the soundtrack of the film Transporter 2. The single topped the charts in France, the Ukraine and Indonesia; "Undress Me" was also released in several countries, reaching number 1 in Turkey and Lebanon.

In 2008, Anggun released her fourth international album, Elevation, which saw her experiment with hip hop and urban music. Her first single "Crazy" was released in international market, French version of "Si tu l'avoues" and Indonesian version of "Jadi Milikmu". She had collaboration with Russian singer Max Lorens for single "О нас с тобой" a version of Russian single from "No Song". In Indonesia, it sold over 550.000 copies album and certificated Double Platinum by ASIRI. Unfortunately, the album became lowest sales in the whole of international market.

Anggun' fifth international album, Echoes (English version) and Échos (French version) was released in May 2011 under the label April Earth, his own record company. It had produced two singles: "Mon meilleur amour" and "Je partirai". The single "Mon meilleur amour" topped the charts at number 1 on Indonesia Airplay Chart and French International Airplay Chart and also earning Platinum Export Award with sales of 300.500 copies. The album was certificated 4× Platinum in 1 week on Indonesia. On November 20, 2015, Anggun has released the sixth French-language album Toujours un ailleurs by TF1 Musique. It debuted at number 43 in the France and Belgium.

Albums

Studio albums

Compilation albums

Soundtrack albums

Extended plays

Singles

As lead artist

As featured artist

Promotional singles

Music videos

Notes

References

External links 
 Anggun official website

Discography
Discographies of Indonesian artists
Pop music discographies
Contemporary R&B discographies
Rock music group discographies